State Route 89 (SR 89) is a north-south state highway in the farmland of West Tennessee.

Route description 
The first few miles of SR 89 hugs the Dyer-Gibson County line. SR 89 then intersects US 45W and US 45E, in the towns of Kenton and Sharon, respectively. SR 89 enters Weakley County and crosses the Rutherford and South Forks of the Obion River between those two intersections. East of Sharon, SR 89 then turns northeastward to the Weakley County seat, Dresden, where it intersects State Routes 22, 239, 54, and 118. Further northeast, SR 89 intersects SR 190 and crosses the North Fork of the Obion River at Palmersville before reaching its northern terminus at the Kentucky state line. This is where the road continues as Kentucky Route 381 into southern Graves County.

Major intersections

See also

References

External links
Tennessee Department of Transportation

089
089
089
089